Leucopogon foliosus  is a species of flowering plant in the heath family Ericaceae and is endemic to the south-west of Western Australia. It is a low, spreading shrub with hairy young branchlets, spirally arranged, erect, linear, narrowly egg-shaped to narrowly elliptic leaves, and white, narrowly bell-shaped flowers.

Description

Taxonomy
Leucopogon foliosus was first formally described in 2016 by Michael Hislop in the journal Nuytsia from specimens he collected in Badgingarra National Park in 2004. The specific epithet (foliosus) means "leafy", "many-leaved", referring to the leafy inflorescence of this species.

Distribution and habitat
This leucopogon grows in heath between Mount Lesueur and a little south of Cataby in the Geraldton Sandplains bioregion of south-western Western Australia.

Conservation status
Leucopogon foliosus is listed as "Priority Three" by the Government of Western Australia Department of Biodiversity, Conservation and Attractions, meaning that it is poorly known and known from only a few locations but is not under imminent threat.

References

foliosus
Ericales of Australia
Flora of Western Australia
Plants described in 2016